Jeremy Howe (born 29 June 1990) is a professional Australian rules footballer playing for the Collingwood Football Club in the Australian Football League (AFL). He previously played for the Melbourne Football Club from 2011 to 2015.

Career
Originally from Dodges Ferry in the Southern Football League, Howe represented Tasmania at the 2009 AFL National Under 18 Championships, but was not selected in the 2009 AFL Draft. Howe also played some games for the Lauderdale Football Club in the 2009 season.The fourth-year electrical apprentice subsequently moved to Tasmanian Football League side Hobart for the 2010 season. A full-forward, Howe made an immediate impact for the Tigers, becoming well known for his bleached blonde hair and high-flying marks. A player with impressive kicking skills and a big leap, Howe was recruited by Melbourne with the 33rd selection in the 2010 AFL Draft. His spectacular marking has drawn comparison with fellow Tasmanian and former Melbourne high-flyer, Russell Robertson.

Howe made his debut against Essendon in Round 11 of the 2011 AFL season. Gathering 19 disposals in an impressive debut, Howe kicked his first AFL goal with a "miraculous snap" in the third quarter, helping Melbourne to a 33-point victory.
Howe is known for his high-flying and crowd pleasing marks that light up the stadium. In 2012 he won the Mark of the Year award, an award for which he has had a league record 35 career nominations.

In October 2015, Howe was traded to the Collingwood Football Club.

During the first round of the 2023 AFL season Howe suffered an arm injury in the third quarter after attempting a mark, colliding with Tyson Stengle's back, and landing awkwardly. It was deemed too gruesome to be replayed or zoomed in on, and he was carried off the field in a stretcher and taken to hospital. Following the match it was revealed that he had broken his arm and would have to go surgery, sidelining him indefinitely.

Personal life
Howe is the cousin of Australian and Tasmanian cricketer Matthew Wade. He attended Rose Bay High School in Hobart.

Statistics
Updated to the end of the 2022 season.

|-
| 2011 ||  || 38
| 13 || 18 || 8 || 100 || 61 || 161 || 70 || 20 || 1.4 || 0.6 || 7.7 || 4.7 || 12.4 || 5.4 || 1.5
|- 
| 2012 ||  || 38
| 22 || 19 || 25 || 227 || 122 || 349 || 122 || 68 || 0.9 || 1.1 || 10.3 || 5.5 || 15.9 || 5.5 || 3.1
|-
| 2013 ||  || 38
| 21 || 28 || 16 || 187 || 97 || 284 || 120 || 27 || 1.3 || 0.8 || 8.9 || 4.6 || 13.5 || 5.7 || 1.3
|- 
| 2014 ||  || 38
| 22 || 5 || 5 || 244 || 133 || 377 || 127 || 57 || 0.2 || 0.2 || 11.1 || 6.0 || 17.1 || 5.8 || 2.6
|-
| 2015 ||  || 38
| 22 || 10 || 11 || 198 || 115 || 313 || 111 || 57 || 0.5 || 0.5 || 9.0 || 5.2 || 14.2 || 5.0 || 2.6
|- 
| 2016 ||  || 38
| 20 || 3 || 5 || 244 || 140 || 384 || 142 || 52 || 0.2 || 0.3 || 12.2 || 7.0 || 19.2 || 7.1 || 2.6
|-
| 2017 ||  || 38
| 21 || 3 || 2 || 294 || 164 || 458 || 181 || 33 || 0.1 || 0.1 || 14.0 || 7.8 || 21.8 || 8.6 || 1.6
|- 
| 2018 ||  || 38
| 21 || 2 || 2 || 269 || 125 || 394 || 147 || 41 || 0.1 || 0.1 || 12.8 || 6.0 || 18.8 || 7.0 || 2.0
|-
| 2019 ||  || 38
| 21 || 1 || 0 || 268 || 96 || 364 || 142 || 30 || 0.1 || 0.0 || 12.8 || 4.6 || 17.3 || 6.8 || 1.4
|- 
| 2020 ||  || 38
| 4 || 0 || 0 || 66 || 20 || 86 || 26 || 8 || 0.0 || 0.0 || 16.5 || 5.0 || 21.5 || 6.5 || 2.0
|-
| 2021 ||  || 38
| 8 || 1 || 0 || 98 || 41 || 139 || 46 || 19 || 0.1 || 0.0 || 12.3 || 5.1 || 17.4 || 5.8 || 2.4
|-
| 2022 ||  || 38
| 24 || 1 || 0 || 259 || 126 || 385 || 141 || 35 || 0.0 || 0.0 || 10.8 || 5.3 || 16.0 || 5.9 || 1.5
|- class=sortbottom
! colspan=3 | Career
! 219 !! 91 !! 74 !! 2454 !! 1240 !! 3694 !! 1375 !! 447 !! 0.4 !! 0.3 !! 11.2 !! 5.7 !! 16.9 !! 6.3 !! 2.0
|}

Notes

Honours and achievements
Individual
 All Stars Representative Honours in Bushfire Relief Match: 2020
 AFL Mark of the Year: 2012
 Harold Ball Memorial Trophy (Melbourne Best First-Year Player): 2011
 Melbourne Leading Goalkicker: 2013 (28)
 22under22 team: 2012

References

External links

Living people
1990 births
Casey Demons players
Hobart Football Club players
Melbourne Football Club players
Collingwood Football Club players
Lauderdale Football Club players
Australian rules footballers from Hobart